Fiebre, also known as Fever, is a 1971 Argentine sexploitation film directed, produced and written by Armando Bó and starring Isabel Sarli. It was released on 22 June 1972 in Argentina.
Fiebre is the name of the horse in the film.

Plot
The two passions of a woman: horses and the man who caused her husband's suicide.

Cast
 Isabel Sarli
 Armando Bó as Juan
 Horacio Priani as Fernando
 Mario Casado as Marco
 Álex Castillo
 Santiago Gómez Cou
 
 Claude Marting
 Juan José Míguez
 Pablo Moret
 Miguel Paparelli

Reception
Eduardo Saglul in La Opinión said: "Equal distance from absurdism and realism, some feverish moments create a certain unreal climate". Manrupe and Portela write:
"Quite a horse classic, listed that year in Variety as one of the 50 highest-grossing films in the world. It includes unmissable dream sequences."

References

External links
 

1971 films
1970s Spanish-language films
Argentine erotic films
Films directed by Armando Bó
Sexploitation films
1970s Argentine films